Cranmer Mugisha  is an Anglican bishop in Uganda: he has been  Bishop of Muhabura since 2007.

References

Anglican bishops of Muhabura
Uganda Christian University alumni
21st-century Anglican bishops in Uganda
Year of birth missing (living people)
Living people